Samuel Afful is a Ghanaian professional footballer who currently plays for Sekondi Hasaacas in the Division One League.

Career
Samuel Afful has played for several teams and is currently playing with Sekondi Hasaacas as a forward.

International career
In November 2013, coach Maxwell Konadu invited him to be a part of the Ghana squad for the 2013 WAFU Nations Cup. He helped the team to a first-place finish after Ghana beat Senegal by three goals to one.

References

Living people
Ghanaian footballers
Sekondi Hasaacas F.C. players
WAFU Nations Cup players
1995 births
Association football forwards
Ghana international footballers
Ghana under-20 international footballers
Ghana A' international footballers
2014 African Nations Championship players
Ghanaian expatriate sportspeople in Iraq
Ghanaian expatriate sportspeople in Tanzania
Ghanaian expatriate footballers
Expatriate footballers in Iraq
Expatriate footballers in Tanzania